Johann Dietrich Alfken (11 June 1862 in Frankfurt – 14 February 1945 in Rüthersdorf, Berlin) was a German entomologist who specialised in Hymenoptera especially Apoidea.

His collection is shared between the Museum für Naturkunde in Berlin and the Naturkundemuseum Erfurt.

Partial list of publications 
(1902) Die nordwestdeutschen Prosopis-Arten. (Hym.). Zeitschrift Für Systematische Hymenopterologie Und Dipterologie, 2(2):65-91. https://www.biodiversitylibrary.org/page/13367899
(1902) Nachträgliche Notiz zu dem Artikel über die Prosopis - Arten. Zeitschrift Für Systematische Hymenopterologie Und Dipterologie, 2(2):109. https://www.biodiversitylibrary.org/page/13367945
(1902) Zur Kenntnis der Prosopis annularis K. (= (dilatata K.)-Gruppe. (Hym.). Zeitschrift Für Systematische Hymenopterologie Und Dipterologie, 2(4):193-195. https://www.biodiversitylibrary.org/page/13368037
(1903) Beitrag zur Insectenfauna der Hawaiischen und Neuseenländischen Inseln. (Ergebnisse einer Reise nach dem Pacific.) Schauinsland 1896–1897. Zoologische Jahrbücher, Abteilung für Systematik, Geographie und Biologie der Thiere, 19:561-628. https://www.biodiversitylibrary.org/page/10194235
(1903) Zwei neue Bienen aus Japan. (Hym.). Zeitschrift Für Systematische Hymenopterologie Und Dipterologie, 3(4):209-211. https://www.biodiversitylibrary.org/page/13746769
(1903) Zur Kenntnis einiger Centris-Arten. Zeitschrift Für Systematische Hymenopterologie Und Dipterologie, 3(4):211-213. https://www.biodiversitylibrary.org/page/13746771
(1904) Beitrag zur Synonymie der Apiden. (Hym.). Zeitschrift Für Systematische Hymenopterologie Und Dipterologie, 4(1):1-3. https://www.biodiversitylibrary.org/page/13746991
(1904) Ueber die von Brullé autgestellten griechischen Andrena-Arten. (Hym.). Zeitschrift Für Systematische Hymenopterologie Und Dipterologie, 4(5):289-295. https://www.biodiversitylibrary.org/page/13747313
(1904) Andrena curvungula Thoms. und A. Pandellei (Pér.) Saund. (Hym.). Zeitschrift Für Systematische Hymenopterologie Und Dipterologie, 4(6):320-321. https://www.biodiversitylibrary.org/page/13747348
(1904) Neue palaearktische Prosopis-Arten und -Varietäten. (Hymn.). Zeitschrift Für Systematische Hymenopterologie Und Dipterologie, 4(6):322-327. https://www.biodiversitylibrary.org/page/13747350
(1905) Melitta nigricans n. sp., eine neue deutsche Biene. (Hym.). Zeitschrift Für Systematische Hymenopterologie Und Dipterologie, 5(2):95-96. https://www.biodiversitylibrary.org/page/33765229
(1912) Die Bienenfauna von Bremen. Abh. naturw. Ver. Bremen, 22:1-137.

References
Gusenleitner, F. 1991 Wildbienenforschung in Österreich. Kataloge des Oberösterr. Landesmuseums, NF 10:103-153 Portr.

German entomologists
Hymenopterists
1862 births
1945 deaths